Elachista sagittifera is a species of moth in the family Elachistidae. It was described by Alfred Philpott in 1927. It is endemic to New Zealand and is known from Arthur's Pass. It is similar in appearance to Elachista thallophora. Adults are on the wing in February.

Taxonomy
This species was first described by Alfred Phipott in 1927 using specimens collected by himself and Stewart Lindsay at Arthur's Pass in February. The holotype specimen is held in the Canterbury Museum.

Description
Philpott originally described this species as follows:

This species is similar in appearance to Elachista thallophora but differs in how the stripes are arranged on the forewings.

Distribution

This species is endemic to New Zealand. It is known from Arthur's Pass.

Behaviour
Adults are on the wing in February.

References

Moths described in 1927
sagittifera
Moths of New Zealand
Endemic fauna of New Zealand
Taxa named by Alfred Philpott
Endemic moths of New Zealand